The 2016 Men's Junior South American Volleyball Championship was the 23rd edition of the tournament, organised by South America's governing volleyball body, the Confederación Sudamericana de Voleibol (CSV). 
The tournament will feature six teams and takes place from 5 to 9 October, in Bariloche, Argentina. The top teams will qualify for the 2017 World Championship.

Competing nations

First round

Pool A

|}

|}

Pool B

|}

|}

Final round

5th place 

|}

Championship bracket

Semifinals 

|}

3rd place 

|}

Final 

|}

2016 in volleyball
Men's South American Volleyball Championships